Sanjay Jadhav (born on 18 July 1970) is an Indian cinematographer and a Hindi and Marathi film director.

Career
Jadhav is an Indian cinematographer and film director in Bollywood and Marathi cinema, who is best known for his 2013 film, Duniyadari. The film was produced by the production house Dreaming24Seven along with Deepak Rane and was presented by Video Palace. In 2014, Jadhav directed Pyaar Vali Love Story, a romantic drama set in the 90s. He also directed the 2015 romantic drama film Tu Hi Re starring Swapnil Joshi, Sai Tamhankar and Tejaswini Pandit, as well as the 2016 action film Guru starring Ankush Chaudhari and Urmila Kanitkar. Jadhav has also produced several television shows, including Marathi sitcom Dil Dosti Duniyadari, aired on Zee Marathi, the thriller serial Duheri on Star Pravah, and a show called Freshers on Zee Yuva. He was recently a judge on the dance reality show 2 MAD, along with actress Amruta Khanvilkar and film choreographer Umesh Jadhav. He presently plays the role of a lawyer in the Marathi TV show Kaay Ghadla Tya Ratri?

Filmography

Cinematographer

Producer
 Dil Dosti Duniyadari Zee Marathi Serial 
 Duheri Star Pravah Serial 
 Freshers Zee Yuva Serial
 Anjali Zee Yuva Serial

References

External links
 

Living people
Hindi film cinematographers
Marathi film cinematographers
Marathi film directors
Hindi-language film directors
1970 births
Male actors in Marathi television